SS James L. Ackerson was a Liberty ship built in the United States during World War II. She was named after James L. Ackerson, a naval constructor and the general manager and vice president of the US Shipping Board Emergency Fleet Corporation from 1918-1920.

Construction
James L. Ackerson was laid down on 1 January 1944, under a Maritime Commission (MARCOM) contract, MC hull 2468, by the St. Johns River Shipbuilding Company, Jacksonville, Florida; she was sponsored by Mrs. James L. Ackerson, the widow of the namesake, and was launched on 29 February 1944.

History
She was allocated to the Wessel Duval & Company, on 16 March 1944. On 18 May 1946, she was laid up in the National Defense Reserve Fleet, Suisun Bay, California. She was sold for commercial use, 22 January 1947, to Stavros S. Niarchos, for $544,506. She was removed from the fleet on 27 January 1947. James L. Ackerson was renamed Captain John Matarangas and flagged in Greece. She was renamed Artemis in 1952, and scrapped in Japan, in 1967.

References

Bibliography

 
 
 
 

 

Liberty ships
Ships built in Jacksonville, Florida
1944 ships
Suisun Bay Reserve Fleet
Liberty ships transferred to Greece